Motto Moriagaro (stylized in caps) is a reissue of Japanese-American singer-songwriter Ai's tenth studio album, Moriagaro (2013). It was released on November 20, 2013, by EMI Records Japan, four months after the original album. The reissue features two new songs, including promotional single "Run Free" featuring Miliyah Kato and Verbal, two remixes and a piano version of "Dear Mama". For physical release, a second disc includes special DJ mixes by DJ Hirakatsu.
Ai (singer) albums
2013 compilation albums
Reissue albums
EMI Records albums
Universal Music Group albums
Universal Music Japan albums
Albums produced by Ai (singer)

Background and release 
Ai previously released her tenth studio album, Moriagaro, in June 2013. In October 2013, it was revealed the album would be reissued, titled Motto Moriagaro. Two of the bonus tracks previously were used in TV commercials prior to the release of the album reissue. "Get Your Hands Up" was used as the Ya-man Dancing EMS CM song and "Run Free" was used as a song promoting Reebok Classic.

Similar to the original album, recording took place mostly in Tokyo, as well as in West Hollywood, Atlanta and New York City. The album was primarily produced by longtime collaborator Uta, who Ai has worked with since 2009 and various American producers.

Tours 
Ai's Moriagaro Tour began in October in Kanagawa, Japan, and included 33 dates. The final concert was held on December 18, 2013, at the Nippon Budokan in Tokyo.

Track listing 
Credits adapted from the liner notes of Moriagaro and Tidal.Notes

 Track 7 of disc one and 21 of disc two are stylized in all lower case.
 Tracks 1, 3–4, 8, and 10–15 of disc one and 4, 11, 16–18, and 20 of disc two are stylized in all capitals.
 Tracks 6, 16 and 17 of disc one and 8 and 10 of disc two are titled in Japanese.

Charts

Personnel 
Personnel details were sourced from Moriagaros liner notes booklet.ManagerialYuki Arai – executive producer
Takeshi Fukushima – advance marketing chief
Shigetaka Haratake – sales promotion
Hiroyuki Jinno – legal rights and business affairs
Nozomu Kaji – marketing, promotion
Junji Kaseya – associate producer
Kimiko Kato – sales promotion
Saikan Kobayashi – project assistant
Kazuhiro Koike – executive producer

Toshiharu Kojima – artist management
Jiro Koyasu – associate producer
Kyosuke Ochiai – design coordination
Shinobu Ozawa – artist management
Koichi Sakakibara – artist manager
Satomi Takizawa – artist management
Seiichi Watanabe – A&R
Yusuke Yamamoto – project assistantPerformance creditsAi – vocals, background vocals
Che'nelle – vocals (#9)
Jeremih – vocals (#1)

Bridget Kelly – vocals (#8, #15)
Lloyd – vocals (#5)
Swiss Chris – drums (#8)Visuals and imageryAmbush – costume cooperation
Justin Davis – costume cooperation
Noriko Goto – stylist
Ayako Hishinuma – prop creator ('Moriagaro Bling Bling')
Manabu Honchu – design
Justin & Valley – logo design
Akio Kawabata – package coordination
Yasunari Kikuma – photographer

Akemi Ono – hair, make-up
Toshiya Ono – art direction
Shuma Saito – package coordination
Silver Face – prop creator ('Moriagaro Knuckle Rings')
Shigeaki Watanabe – prop creator ('Moriagaro Cap')
Wut Berlin – costume cooperation
X-Closet – costume cooperation
Eiji Yoshimura – designTechnical and production'

Ai – producer (#1, #3-4, #6-7, #9-10)
Arden 'Keys' Altino – co-producer (#8)
Ben-E – producer (#6)
Jo Blaq – mixing, vocal recording (#12)
C3prod – producer (#6)
Tom Coyne – album mastering
D.Clax – producer (#5)
De-Capo Music Group – producer (#1)
DOI – mixing (#1-7, #9-11)
Akene 'The Champ' Dunkley – co-producer (#8)
Jerry 'Wonda' Duplessis – producer (#8)
Fifty 1 Fifty – producer (#9-10, #12)
Keisuke Fujimaki – vocal recording (#4)
Seiji Itabashi – assisting (#8, #11)
Carlos 'Los' Jenkins – vocal recording (#12)

Neeraj Khajanchi – additional vocal recording (#8), vocal recording (#11)
T. Kura – vocal editing (#2)
Sean 'Pen' McMillion – engineering (#5), vocal producer for Lloyd (#5)
Michico – vocal producer (#2)
Yoshinori Morita – vocal recording (#1, #6-7, #9)
Taiji Okuda – Japanese production (#5), recording (#2-3, #10)
Mario Parra – Che'nelle's vocal recording (#9)
Lance Powell – assisting (#8)
Andrew Robertson – assisting (#8)
Mark Roger – vocal recording (#1)
Serge 'Sergical' Tsai – recording (#8)
Uta – producer (#2-4, #7, #11)
Satoshi Yoneda – vocal editing (#2)

Release history

Footnotes

References